South of Santa Fe is a 1942 American Western film directed by Joseph Kane.

Cast 
 Roy Rogers as Roy Rogers
 George "Gabby" Hayes as Gabby Whittaker
 Linda Hayes as Carol Stevens
 Paul Fix as Joe Keenan, aka Harmon
 Arthur Loft as Peter Moreland
 Charles F. Miller as John McMahon
 Sam Flint as Harold Prentiss
 Jack Kirk as Sheriff Benton
 Sons of the Pioneers as Cowhands / Musicians

External links 
 
 

1942 films
1942 Western (genre) films
American Western (genre) films
American black-and-white films
Republic Pictures films
Films directed by Joseph Kane
1940s English-language films
1940s American films